Frank Hunter  may refer to:
 Frank O'Driscoll Hunter (1894–1982), United States Air Force general
 Frank Hunter (rugby union) (1858–1930), Scottish rugby player
 Frank Hunter (musician) (1919–2005), American musician and arranger
 Frank Hunter (photographer), American photographer and university educator
 Francis Hunter (1894–1981), American tennis player